Green Point Common, is a park in Green Point, Cape Town, in South Africa, where numerous playing fields and a golf course are situated. The Green Point Urban Park & Biodiversity Garden is just behind Mouille Point and has an entrance on Bay Road.

External links
 Green Point Park

Parks in Cape Town